Lois E. Jackson (born c. 1938) is a Canadian politician, formerly the mayor of Delta, British Columbia.

Originally from Sudbury, Ontario, Jackson and her husband first moved to Delta in 1969. She was first elected to Delta Municipal Council in 1972. She served from 1972 to 1974; 1976 to 1981, from 1983 to 1993 and from 1996 to 1999.

Jackson was elected in November 1999 to become Delta's second female mayor, replacing the first female mayor Beth Johnson. She was re-elected in a close contest in the 2005 elections to a third term as mayor.

As mayor Jackson opposed a treaty with the Tsawwassen First Nation, for fear it would result in Delta losing its agricultural land.

In December 2005, she was elected chair of the Greater Vancouver Regional District board, of which she had been a member for the previous nine years. Vancouver councillor Peter Ladner spent the week of the Union of B.C. Municipalities convention lobbying for support to challenge current chairwoman Jackson in December 2009.

In early 2018, Jackson announced that she would not be seeking another term as Delta's mayor after 19 years in the position. Surprisingly in September 2018, Jackson announced her bid for a seat on Delta Council. She was elected to council on October 19, 2018.

References

External links

Living people
People from Delta, British Columbia
Women mayors of places in British Columbia
Politicians from Greater Sudbury
Mayors of places in British Columbia
1930s births